is a very small asteroid and near-Earth object of the Apollo group that passed within  of the Earth's surface on 2 December 2018. It was first observed on 29 November 2018 by Hannes Gröller with the Catalina Sky Survey at Catalina Station on Mount Bigelow, Arizona, in the United States.

Orbit 
 orbits the Sun at a distance of 0.98–1.10 AU once every 387 days (semi-major axis of 1.04 AU). Its orbit has an eccentricity of 0.06 and an inclination of 2° with respect to the ecliptic. 

As an Apollo asteroid with an orbital period slightly larger than that of the Earth, its orbit is very similar to that of the Earth, indicating that the object is a piece of lunar ejecta, a fragment of the Moon that was ejected into space when a larger asteroid hit the Moon a long time ago.

2018 flyby 
This was the third-closest approach by an asteroid in 2018, and the 70th asteroid of the year that passed within 1 lunar distance of Earth. Its absolute magnitude of 30.1 indicates a diameter between 2.5 and 5.6 metres.

 remains inside the Earth's sphere of influence from 27 November till 7 December 2018. During the flyby, its orbital period changes from 1.13 to 1.06 years.

At the time of its discovery,  had a 2% chance to hit Earth in early December 2018. The possibility of impact was ruled out soon after, as more data became available.

Other flybys
 will pass within  of Earth in December 2019.

With a short observation arc of 1.69 days, the asteroid is on the Sentry risk list, with a probability of 1 in 11,000 for an impact between 2085 and 2118.

Flyby gallery

See also 
 List of asteroid close approaches to Earth

References

External links
 List Of Apollo Minor Planets (by designation), Minor Planet Center
 
 

Minor planet object articles (unnumbered)
Discoveries by the Catalina Sky Survey
Near-Earth objects in 2018
20181129